Exercises in Futility is a 2008 album of solo guitar recorded by Marc Ribot and released on Tzadik Records' Composer Series. It features compositions that Ribot wrote as "setups for improvising" that "teach guitarists how to play with and in spite of futility".

Track listing
All compositions are by Marc Ribot.
 "Etude No. 1. Five Gestures" – 5:47  
 "Etude No. 2. Morton 1" – 4:59  
 "Etude No. 3. Elvis" – 4:04  
 "Etude No. 4. Bombasto" – 2:53  
 "Etude No. 5. Lame" – 3:47  
 "Etude No. 6. Cowboy" – 1:46  
 "Etude No. 7. Ballad" – 2:53  
 "Etude No. 8. Groove?" – 3:14  
 "Etude No. 9. Morton 2" – 3:20  
 "Etude No. 10. Min" – 1:23  
 "Etude No. 11. Ascending" – 2:03  
 "Etude No. 12. Mirror" – 4:21  
 "Etude No. 13. Wank" – 4:20  
 "Etude No. 14. Event on 10th Avenue" – 1:18  
 "The Joy of Repetition" – 9:49

Personnel
Marc Ribot – guitars

References

External links

2008 albums
Marc Ribot albums
Tzadik Records albums